Baldwin III (–962), called the Young, was Count of Flanders, who briefly ruled the County of Flanders together with his father, Arnulf I, from 958 until his early death.

Baldwin III was born . He was the son of Count Arnulf I of Flanders and his second wife, Adele of Vermandois (c. 915 – 969). Shortly before 961, Baldwin married Matilda (died 1008), daughter of Duke Hermann Billung of Saxony. They had a son, Arnulf (c. 960 – 987).

Arnulf I made Baldwin III co-ruler of Flanders in 958. During his short rule, Baldwin was responsible for establishing the wool manufacturing industry at Ghent and markets at other towns in Flanders. Baldwin III died of smallpox on 1 January 962, after a campaign against the Normans. After Baldwin's death, Arnulf I arranged for King Lothair of France to become the guardian of Baldwin's son, Arnulf II, who succeeded Arnulf I.

See also

Counts of Flanders family tree

References

External links
 

House of Flanders
Baldwin 3
940s births
962 deaths
Year of birth uncertain